County Tyrone is one of the six counties of Northern Ireland, one of the nine counties of Ulster and one of the thirty-two traditional counties of Ireland. It is no longer used as an administrative division for local government but retains a strong identity in popular culture.

The county derives its name and general geographic location from Tír Eoghain, a Gaelic kingdom under the O'Neill dynasty which existed until the 17th century.

Name
The name Tyrone is derived , the name given to the conquests made by the Cenél nEógain from the provinces of Airgíalla and Ulaid. Historically, it was anglicised as Tirowen or Tyrowen, which are closer to the Irish pronunciation.

History

Historically Tyrone (then Tír Eoghain or Tirowen) was much larger in size, stretching as far north as Lough Foyle, and comprised part of modern-day County Londonderry east of the River Foyle. The majority of County Londonderry was carved out of Tyrone between 1610 and 1620 when that land went to the Guilds of London to set up profit making schemes based on natural resources located there. Tyrone was the traditional stronghold of the various O'Neill clans and families, the strongest of the Gaelic Irish families in Ulster, surviving into the seventeenth century. The ancient principality of Tír Eoghain, the inheritance of the O'Neills, included the whole of the present counties of Tyrone and Londonderry, and the four baronies of West Inishowen, East Inishowen, Raphoe North and Raphoe South in County Donegal.

In 1608 during O'Doherty's Rebellion areas of the country were plundered and burnt by the forces of Sir Cahir O'Doherty following his destruction of Derry. However, O'Doherty's men avoided the estates of the recently fled Earl of Tyrone around Dungannon, fearing Tyrone's anger if he returned from his exile.

Geography
The flat peatlands of East Tyrone border the shoreline of the largest lake in the British Isles, Lough Neagh, rising gradually across to the more mountainous terrain in the west of the county, the area surrounding the Sperrin Mountains, the highest point being Sawel Mountain at a height of 678 m (2,224 ft). Annaghone lays claim to be the geographical centre of Northern Ireland.

Tyrone is connected by land to the county of Fermanagh to the southwest; Monaghan to the south; Armagh to the southeast; Londonderry to the north; and Donegal to the west. Across Lough Neagh to the east, it borders County Antrim. It is the eighth largest of Ireland's thirty-two counties by area and tenth largest by population. It is the second largest of Ulster's nine traditional counties by area and fourth largest by population.

Administration 
The county was administered by Tyrone County Council from 1899 until the abolition of county councils in Northern Ireland in 1973.

Demography
It is one of four counties in Northern Ireland which currently has a majority of the population from a Catholic community background, according to the 2011 census. In 1900 County Tyrone had a population of 197,719, while in 2011 it was 177,986.

Settlements

Large towns
(population of 18,000 or more and under 75,000 at 2001 Census)
Omagh

Medium towns
(population of 10,000 or more and under 18,000 at 2001 Census)
Cookstown
Dungannon
Strabane

Small towns
(population of 4,500 or more and under 10,000 at 2001 Census)
Coalisland

Intermediate settlements
(population of 2,250 or more and under 4,500 at 2001 Census)
Castlederg

Villages
(population of 1,000 or more and under 2,250 at 2001 Census)
Ardboe
Carrickmore
Dromore
Fintona
Fivemiletown
Killyclogher
Moy
Newtownstewart
Sion Mills

Small villages
(population of less than 1,000 at 2001 Census)

Subdivisions

Baronies

Clogher
Dungannon Lower
Dungannon Middle
Dungannon Upper
Omagh East
Omagh West
Strabane Lower
Strabane Upper
Parishes

Townlands

Future railway revival
There is the possibility of the line being reopened to Dungannon railway station from Portadown.

Sport
Major sports in Tyrone include Gaelic games, association football, rugby union and cricket:
Gaelic football is more widely played than hurling in Tyrone. The Tyrone GAA football side has had considerable success since 2000, winning four All Ireland titles (in 2003, 2005, 2008 and 2021). They have also won sixteen Ulster titles (1956, 1957, 1973, 1984, 1986, 1989, 1995, 1996, 2001, 2003, 2007, 2009, 2010, 2016, 2017 and 2021) and two National League titles (in 2002 and 2003).
Association football also has a large following in Tyrone. Omagh Town F.C. were members of the Irish Football League until they folded in 2005 due to financial problems. Dungannon Swifts F.C. compete in the NIFL Premiership - the top division. Other teams include NIFL Championship side Dergview F.C.
Rugby union is very popular in the county. Dungannon RFC plays in the All-Ireland League. Other teams include Omagh RFC, Clogher Valley RFC, Cookstown RFC and Strabane RFC.
International Cricket is also played on the Bready Cricket Club Ground which is owned by Bready Cricket Club. It is Ireland's fourth venue for International Cricket hosting its first International Cricket match when Ireland played against Scotland in a series of T20I matches in June 2015. It was selected as a venue to host matches in the 2015 ICC World Twenty20 Qualifier tournament.

Notable people

 Philomena Begley, Irish country music singer
 James E. Boyd, seventh Governor of Nebraska
 Paul Brady, musician
 William Burke (1792–1829), grave robber and murderer
 Peter Canavan, former All Ireland Tyrone captain
 William Carleton (1794–1869), writer
 Chipzel, musician
 Darren Clarke, professional golfer
 Tom Clarke, Irish Republican and leader of the 1916 Easter Rising
 Jimmy Cricket, comedian
 Sidney Elisabeth Croskery, doctor
 Austin Currie, politician, founding member SDLP; Member of Parliament (MP) and later Teachta Dála (TD)
 Janet Devlin, soul and pop artist and contestant on The X Factor  (UK)
 Ryan Dolan, Ireland representative at the Eurovision Song Contest 2013
 Brian Dooher, former captain of the Tyrone senior football team
 Hugo Duncan, singer and broadcaster on BBC Radio Ulster
 John Dunlap (1747–1812), publisher of the first American daily newspaper the Pennsylvania Packet in 1784, also the printer of the American Declaration of Independence
 Brian Friel, dramatist and theatre director
 Sylvia Hermon, Member of Parliament for North Down, born in Galbally, County Tyrone
 Aaron Hughes, captain of the Northern Ireland football team
 John Hughes (1797–1864), first Archbishop of Roman Catholic Diocese of New York
 Martin Hurson, Irish Republican
 Ryan Kelly, singer with Celtic Thunder
 Benedict Kiely (1919–2007), writer and broadcaster
 Gerry McKenna MRIA (1953–), biologist; Vice Chancellor and President, University of Ulster; Senior Vice President, Royal Irish Academy
 William McMaster (1811–1887), founder of Canadian Bank of Commerce and namesake of McMaster University
 Mary Mallon (1869–1938), more commonly known as Typhoid Mary
 W. F. Marshall (1888–1954), the 'Bard of Tyrone', Presbyterian minister, author and poet
 Thomas Mellon, founder of Mellon Bank, now Bank of New York Mellon
 Sister Nivedita (1867–1911), Irish social activist
 Flann O'Brien (1911–1966), writer
 Dominic Ó Mongain (1715–1770s), poet and harpist
 Arthur O'Neill (1737–1816), travelling blind Irish harpist
 Hugh O'Neill, Earl of Tyrone (Aodh Mór Ó Néill) (1550–1616), Irish leader during the Nine Years' War
 Thomas Porter, member of the Wisconsin State Assembly
 Martha M. Simpson (1864-1948), educationalist
 Victor Sloan MBE, visual artist
 Ivan Sproule, football player for Bristol City F.C.
 Dennis Taylor, former world snooker champion
 John K. Tener, former baseball player and Governor of Pennsylvania. Creator of Congressional Baseball Game.
 Colin Broderick, Author and Filmographer.

See also

 Abbeys and priories in Northern Ireland (County Tyrone)
 High Sheriff of Tyrone
 List of civil parishes of County Tyrone
 List of places in County Tyrone
 List of townlands in County Tyrone
 Lord Lieutenant of Tyrone
 Ulster American Folk Park
 The Moorlough Shore

References

Further reading
 Joost, Augusteijn (ed.) (1920s). The Memoirs of John M. Regan, a Catholic Officer in the RIC and RUC, 1909–48. Co. Tyrone. .
 McNeill, I. (2010). The Flora of County Tyrone. National Museums of Northern Ireland.

External links

Tyrone on the interactive map of the counties of Great Britain and Ireland – Wikishire
A Flavour of Tyrone
County Tyrone.com

 
Tyrone
 
O'Neill dynasty